Nadarius Clark (born 1995) is an American activist and politician who is the delegate for the 79th district of the Virginia House of Delegates. Clark, a Democrat, defeated incumbent Steve Heretick in the Democratic primary and Republican nominee Lawrence Mason in the 2021 Virginia House of Delegates election.

References

Living people
1995 births
Democratic Party members of the Virginia House of Delegates